Business US Highway 287-P (Bus. US 287-P) is a  business loop of US Highway 287 in the state of Texas that serves as main street for Mansfield, downtown Fort Worth and Saginaw. The highway is known as Main Street while in Mansfield, Mansfield Highway while in southern Fort Worth, Kennedale Parkway in Kennedale, Riverside Drive and Rosedale Street in central Fort Worth, Commerce Street in downtown Fort Worth, Main Street in northern Fort Worth, and Saginaw Boulevard in Saginaw. The highway was originally designated on January 14, 1991, to replace a portion of Loop 496, and the old route of US 287 and US 81. The route was then rerouted several times during the 1990s. Bus. US 287-P is located almost entirely in Tarrant County, and is mostly located in Fort Worth. The highway is, as of 2010, the longest business route of US 287, while located in Texas. Bus. US 287-P is one of the few highways to be designated as a north–south highway.

Route description

Bus. US 287-P begins at an exit on US 287/US 81. The exit ramp continues for a short length, and is two lanes, made of concrete. The exit intersects the two lane FM 718, and Bus. US 287-P officially begins.

Just after the FM 718 intersection, the highway passes a small gas station and fast food restaurant. The road proceeds past two large farms, and another restaurant, before the highway lanes merge, and the route becomes just two lanes. The highway exits Fort Worth, passes several large warehouses and junk yards, and a large neighborhood. The passes, as a bridge, over a series of railroad tracks, and passes a large train station. The highway continues alongside a railroad track, and passes Hicks Airfield. The highway passes several small houses, before splitting, with a small, grassy, non-elevated margin placed between the lanes. The highway passes through a large field, and expands to four lanes, total. All this time, a set of railroad tracks is running alongside the highway. The road continues past several warehouses, and a second railroad comes alongside the road. Then the Old Decatur Road branches off of the route, which provides access to a large neighborhood. The highway passes a few large farms, before intersecting with Bailey Boswell Road, and entering the city of Saginaw. The road then comes back together, with a center turn lane dividing the two opposite directions. The highway passes a large railroad depot, and a long row of fast-food restaurants, and proceeds through downtown Saginaw.

BUS U.S. 287-P then reaches its interchange with Interstate 820. The interchange is a cloverleaf, and is BUS U.S. 287-P's only exit. The route continues past the interstate, and passes a large railroad depot, before passing the Fort Worth Meacham International Airport. The highway provides the main access to most of the airport. The highway then enters the North Side neighborhood of Fort Worth. The railroad tracks then pull away from the highway. The road continues past several small businesses and restaurants, and intersects Long Avenue, which provides access to Washington Heights Elementary School. The highway continues south, passing a few more small restaurants, before intersecting Texas State Highway 183. The highway continues south for a few hundred yards, before entering the Fort Worth Stockyards. The highway becomes a cobblestone road, and passes several old west themed restaurants and stores. The highway exits the stockyards, and becomes asphalt again, but the highway still appears to be inside the site. The highway intersects several roads, and continues to pass themed buildings, until an intersection with Central Avenue, and the highway enters the Marine Park neighborhood. The road continues through Marine Park, intersecting Northside Drive, and a set of railroad tracks. The highway passes a few small businesses, before becoming a large bridge, passing over the Trinity River.

After crossing over the Trinity River, the highway splits and becomes Commerce Street and Houston Street. The route intersects Spur 347, and passes around the Tarrant County Courthouse.

History
Bus. US 287-P was first proposed on June 21, 1990, and was approved and designated on January 14, 1991. The original route stretched from a junction with US 81/US 287 southward to US 287 in Mansfield, and replaced an old route of US 81/US 287 and a portion of Loop 496. On October 25, 1990, the route of the highway was shortened by about a mile, and rerouted to Meacham Field, a few miles to the west of the original designation. The route was minorly rerouted on January 5, 2012, although rerouting the highway was proposed on December 16, 2010. The course of the route was described as traveling from an intersection with US 287/US 81, southward through Saginaw, to Spur 280 in Fort Worth, and traveling on to I-35W, running concurrent with I-35W, then through Kennedale and on to Mansfield, to a southern terminus with US 287.

Major junctions

See also

Notes

References

87-2 Business (Mansfield-Fort Worth)
Business (Mansfield-Fort Worth, Texas)
Transportation in Tarrant County, Texas
87-2 Business (Masfield-Fort Worth, Texas)
Mansfield, Texas
Transportation in Johnson County, Texas